The Dandridge Historic District in Dandridge, Tennessee, is a historic district that is listed on the National Register of Historic Places.

The historic district comprises Dandridge's downtown area. Significant properties in the district include the second Jefferson County courthouse, a Greek Revival building completed in 1845, as well as four of the town's original taverns, Roper Tavern, Hickman Tavern, Shepherd's Inn, and Thomas Tavern. Federal and Greek Revival architectural styles are predominant among the early buildings.

The historic district is separated from Douglas Lake by a dike constructed in 1942 to protect the downtown from inundation after the Tennessee Valley Authority built Douglas Dam.

References

External links

Buildings and structures in Jefferson County, Tennessee
Historic districts on the National Register of Historic Places in Tennessee
National Register of Historic Places in Jefferson County, Tennessee